The 2013 ICC Americas Twenty20 Division One is a cricket tournament that took place between 18 and 24 March 2013. The United States hosted the event, with all matches played at the Central Broward Regional Park in Lauderhill, Florida.

Teams
Teams that qualified are as follows:

Squads

Fixtures

Points Table

Matches

Statistics

Most Runs
The top five run scorers (total runs) are included in this table.

Most Wickets
The top five wicket takers (total wickets) are listed in this table.

See also

2013 ICC World Twenty20 Qualifier

References

2014 ICC World Twenty20
Icc World Cricket League
Icc World Cricket League
ICC World Cricket League Americas Region Twenty20 Division One